Mark Allen Simpson (born February 4, 1961) is a former American professional basketball player. With 2.03 meters tall, he played in the forward position.

College career
Born in Fort Wayne, Indiana, Simpson played his college career in the Catawba College.

Professional career
He was selected in the seventh round with the 149th pick in the 1984 NBA draft by the Denver Nuggets, but did not play in the NBA. He develops his career in Europe, his first season as a professional would be developed in the Israeli Ligat HaAl for Beitar Tel Aviv, in the Greek A National Category for PAOK, in the French Nationale 1 for Caen and then in Israel again for Beitar Tel Aviv. In the 1988-1989 season playing in the Italian Paini Napoli, averaging 22 points during the season and 7 rebounds. His last four seasons as a professional would be based in ACB, Spain, where he plays two years for Cajabilbao and two seasons at Real Madrid, in who averaged 18 points and 5 rebounds per game. Simpson was a player known for being a great point shooter, with Real Madrid, as a pair of foreigners with Rickey Brown, he won the 1991–92 FIBA European Cup against his former team, PAOK. The following year, and 3 foreigners per team, joined Arvydas Sabonis, making double in national competitions winning ACB League and Copa del Rey. After the final, and physical problems in the knees Simpson decides to retire from active practice basketball, but not before failing a drug test by ingesting an American drug called Elixir DM, "without the consent of the club's medical services". Simpson was trying to treat a bad cold. If he had not retired, he would have been sanctioned with 2 years ban to play.

References

External links
 Mark Simpson on the official website of the liga acb

1961 births
Living people
American expatriate basketball people in France
American expatriate basketball people in Greece
American expatriate basketball people in Israel
American expatriate basketball people in Spain
Basket Napoli players
Basketball players from Indiana
Bilbao Basket players
Catawba Indians men's basketball players
Denver Nuggets draft picks
Forwards (basketball)
Liga ACB players
P.A.O.K. BC players
Real Madrid Baloncesto players
American men's basketball players